CJD (Christliches Jugenddorfwerk Deutschlands) is a German Christian nonprofit organization. The organization was founded in 1947 by Christian pastor Arnold Dannenmann. CJD is an organisation that deals with youth, education and social work. Over 155,000 young people and adults every year get the chance to benefit from expert training, professional development, and support for their specific life situations. CJD's "broad range" of education, training and development programs helps primarily young with learning difficulties, such as dyslexia, or behavioral problems. In addition, the organization assists former drug addicts, migrants, refugees, drop-outs, chronically ill, highly gifted, people with physical and mental disabilities, socially disadvantaged, young offenders and youth with a past experience of violence.

Sources

External links
Website of the CJD e.V.

Youth organisations based in Germany
1947 establishments in Germany
Non-profit organisations based in Baden-Württemberg